Yuhuating is an urban subdistrict, located in the built-up area of Yuhua District in Changsha City, Hunan Province, China. New Yuhuating was formed in 2012, the former Yuhuating subdistrict was divided into two subdistricts, new Yuhuating and Jingwanzi. The subdistrict has borders with Jingwanzi Subdistrict to the south, Guitang Subdistrict to the east, Shazitang Subdistrict to the north, Wenyuan Subdistrict of Tianxin District to the west.

References

Yuhua District, Changsha
Yuhua District